E170 may refer to:
 Model E-170 Regional Jet, see Embraer E-Jets
 The E number of a food additive or colouring for calcium carbonate or chalk
 Toyota Corolla (E170), a car